British halfpenny may refer to:
 Halfpenny (British pre-decimal coin)
 Halfpenny (British decimal coin)